Signet Solar is a defunct solar company that was established in 2006 in Menlo Park, California. They produced photovoltaic modules, and have manufacturing plants in India and Germany. The modules are made using thin film silicon technology on large area glass substrates, referred to as Gen 8.5. They filed for Chapter 11 bankruptcy protection in 2012.

India
Signet Solar India, started in 2007, was planning to have the capacity to produce 300 MWp/year by 2012. The factory was located near Chennai.

Germany
The plant in Mochau, near Dresden, began production in 2008 and was expected to have the capacity to produce 120 MWp/year by 2010.

New Mexico
In December, plans were announced to begin construction of a plant in Belen, New Mexico, with an initial capacity of 65 MWp/year when it was to be completed in 2010, and an eventual capacity of 300 MWp/year.

See also
Solar power in India

References

External links
Website

Thin-film cell manufacturers
Companies based in Menlo Park, California
Manufacturing companies based in California
American companies established in 2006
American companies disestablished in 2012